Sign is the fourteenth studio album by British electronic music duo Autechre. It was announced by Warp Records on 2 September 2020 via their Twitter page, and was released on 16 October 2020. The cover and packaging artwork was created by The Designers Republic. The album was broadcast for the first time on 8 October on the Autechre website. It was made available as a digital download for everyone that pre-ordered shortly after.

Critical reception

Sign was met with critical acclaim. At Metacritic, which assigns a normalised rating out of 100 to reviews from professional publications, the album received an average score of 82, based on 12 reviews.

Track listing

Charts

References

External links
 
 

2020 albums
Autechre albums
Warp (record label) albums
Albums with cover art by The Designers Republic